The 2020–21 Virginia Cavaliers women's basketball team represented the University of Virginia during the 2020–21 NCAA Division I women's basketball season. The Cavaliers were led by third year head coach Tina Thompson, and played their home games at John Paul Jones Arena as members the Atlantic Coast Conference.

On January 14, 2021, it was announced that the team would end their season due to COVID-19 concerns.  Virginia was the second team in the Atlantic Coast Conference to suspend their season, after Duke did so on December 25, 2020.

The Cavaliers finished the season 0–5, and 0–2 in ACC play.  Due to their season cancellation they did not participate in the ACC tournament, NCAA tournament or WNIT.

Previous season
The 2019–20 Cavaliers finished the season 13–17 and 8–10 in ACC play to finish in ninth place.  As the ninth seed in the ACC tournament, they lost to Syracuse in Second Round.  The NCAA tournament and WNIT were cancelled due to the COVID-19 outbreak.

Offseason

Departures

Incoming transfers

Recruiting Class

Source:

Roster

Schedule

Source:

|-
!colspan=9 style="background:#00214E; color:#F56D22;"|Non-conference regular season

|-
!colspan=9 style="background:#00214E; color:#F56D22;"|ACC regular season

Rankings

See also
 2020–21 Virginia Cavaliers men's basketball team

References

Virginia Cavaliers women's basketball seasons
Virginia
Virginia
Virginia